Zipaetis scylax, the dark catseye, is a species of butterfly of the family Nymphalidae. It is found from Sikkim to Assam and in northern Burma.

Subspecies
Zipaetis scylax scylax (Assam)
Zipaetis scylax hani (southern Yunnan)

References

Satyrini
Butterflies of Asia
Taxa named by William Chapman Hewitson
Butterflies described in 1863